Doris Fitschen (born 25 October 1968) is a German former footballer who played as a midfielder.

Together with Martina Voss and Silvia Neid, she is considered the most successful German women's footballer, having won seven national titles and six DFB trophies. Fitschen competed for Germany at the 1996 and 2000 Summer Olympics.

Club career
Fitschen was born in Zeven. She signed for the Women's United Soccer Association (WUSA) ahead of the inaugural season in 2001. She was allocated to Philadelphia Charge and scored the team's first ever goal in a 2–0 win at San Diego Spirit on 22 April 2001. Despite missing the final part of the season with a career-ending wrist injury, Fitschen was named WUSA Defensive Player of the Year.

International career
Fitschen's senior debut for the West Germany national team came on 4 October 1986; in a 2–0 win over Denmark. She scored her first international goal in the same game after entering play as a substitute.

At the 1989 European Competition for Women's Football, Fitschen was an important part of the team who claimed West Germany's first major trophy. UEFA named her the tournament's Golden Player.

Following her retirement Fitschen received a special achievement award from UEFA, for her outstanding contribution to women's football.

Honours
TSV Siegen
 Bundesliga: 1993–94, 1995–96
 DFB-Pokal: 1992–93

1. FFC Frankfurt
 Bundesliga: 1998–99, 2000–01
 DFB-Pokal: 1998–99, 1999–2000, 2000–01
 DFB-Hallenpokal: 1997, 1998, 1999

Germany
 UEFA Women's Championship: 1989, 1991, 1995, 1997, 2001
Football at the Summer Olympics: Bronze medal 2000

Individual
 UEFA Women's Championship: Golden Player 1989
 FIFA Women's World Cup: All-Star Team 1999

References

External links

 
 Profile at Women's United Soccer Association

1968 births
Living people
People from Rotenburg (district)
Footballers from Lower Saxony
German women's footballers
Germany women's international footballers
Footballers at the 1996 Summer Olympics
Footballers at the 2000 Summer Olympics
Olympic bronze medalists for Germany
FIFA Century Club
Olympic medalists in football
1991 FIFA Women's World Cup players
1999 FIFA Women's World Cup players
Medalists at the 2000 Summer Olympics
1. FFC Frankfurt players
Philadelphia Charge players
Women's United Soccer Association players
German expatriate women's footballers
German expatriate sportspeople in the United States
Expatriate women's soccer players in the United States
Olympic footballers of Germany
UEFA Women's Championship-winning players
Women's association football defenders